Norwich Township may refer to the following places in the U.S. state of Michigan:

 Norwich Township, Missaukee County, Michigan
 Norwich Township, Newaygo County, Michigan

Michigan township disambiguation pages